Terminator Salvation: The Machinima Series is an American computer animated science-fiction action web series and is part of the Terminator franchise. The series premiered on Machinima on May 18, 2009 and concluded on June 24, 2009. Taking place between the events of Terminator 3: Rise of the Machines and Terminator Salvation, the series was created using real-time computer animation from the video game and serves as a prequel to the game.

It was released on DVD on November 3, 2009.

Production
The web series is written by Andy Shapiro and co-directed by Tor Helmstein. Moon Bloodgood, who appeared in the 2009 film, provided her voice for the film's character Blair Williams in the series and the video game of the same name. Explained by McG, director of Terminator Salvation: "From a film maker's point of view, Machinima provides an incredibly dynamic way to explore live worlds and tell compelling new stories". The video game creator and Halcyon Games president Cos Lazouras said: "Re-purposing our game to produce the very first dramatic series in this medium is a fantastic innovation and will become the norm for game makers in the future". Diane Nelson, president of Warner Bros.: "After meeting with McG and Halcyon's creative teams we could easily see the power and potential of this type of content. The combination of McG and the Game maker's creative talent and the inherent essence of the man vs. machine concept made for a natural feature-length story".

Premise
Set in 2016, years after Judgment Day, the series follows Blair Williams, who is fighting the war against the machines in downtown Los Angeles, while tracking down the computer hacker Laz Howard and trying to persuade him to join sides with the resistance.

Cast
 Moon Bloodgood as Blair Williams
 Cam Clarke as Laz Howard 
 Jim Meskimen as Command

Episodes

References

External links
 
 

2009 web series debuts
2009 web series endings
American adult animated action television series
American adult animated adventure television series
American adult animated science fiction television series
American adult animated web series
American science fiction web series
YouTube original programming
Fiction set in 2016
Action adventure web series
Interquel television series
Prequel television series
Terminator (franchise) mass media
Television series by Warner Bros. Television Studios
Television series by Wonderland Sound and Vision